Raven Arms was a firearms manufacturer established in 1970 by firearms designer George Jennings. The Gun Control Act of 1968 prohibiting the importation of inexpensive handguns prompted Jennings to design the MP-25, a .25-caliber semi-automatic pistol, and enter the firearms business. Raven has been referred to as the original "Ring of Fire" company, a term describing companies known for producing inexpensive Saturday night special handguns.

Raven kept manufacturing costs to a minimum by building their guns from injection-molded Zamak, a zinc alloy.

History
Before Jennings developed the MP-25, a friend who owned a pawn shop that sold firearms complained to Jennings that his supply of inexpensive imported handguns (typically made by Röhm Gesellschaft) had been cut off due to the Gun Control Act of 1968, resulting in a significant loss of sales. At the time, Jennings operated a machine shop that made parts for Southern California aerospace companies. Jennings established Raven Arms to produce the first Raven, the P-25 for his friend, and over the next 20 years, the company sold approximately 2 million variations of the pistols. The first variation of the Raven had a large button sliding safety on the side, and was manufactured in Baldwin Park, California. The second variation changed the safety to a smaller sliding safety, but retained the designation of P-25, and was manufactured in Industry, California (as were all other subsequent Ravens). The third variation changed the design of the pistol slide serrations and was designated the MP-25. The fourth and final variation of the pistol removed the sliding safety and changed it to an upward moving disk safety and retained the designation MP-25. In parallel with this growth, gun-control advocates started pushing legislation in Washington, in state capitals, and in city councils to ban inexpensive weapons.

In November 1991, a fire destroyed the Raven Arms factory. Jennings retired and sold his designs to Phoenix Arms. Phoenix was owned in equal shares by Jennings's ex-wife, his children, four of his grandchildren, and by Raven's former general manager. Phoenix continued to produce the MP-25 as the "Model Raven" and introduced a magazine safety disconnect which rendered the pistol unable to fire without a magazine inserted Phoenix was run under the management of Jennings's son Bruce, and developed additional .22 and .25-caliber pistols, called the HP22 and HP25.

MP-25

The MP-25 can hold six .25 ACP rounds in the magazine, plus one in the chamber, and is finished in chrome, satin nickel or black. The grips can be either wood or imitation mother-of-pearl handles. There is a similar model called the Raven Arms P-25. Both have similar blowback and envelope designs and are essentially identical firearms.

Early models have a sliding bar safety that will not allow the pistol to chamber a round or cock the striker if the safety is not in the fire position when the slide is pulled back. Later models have a push up safety that will not allow the action to be cycled at all when engaged.

There are conflicting views on the MP-25. Critics refer to it by the pejorative term "Saturday night special", as it is both easily concealed and affordable enough that the poor can afford to purchase it. However, Roy Innis, president of the activist group Congress of Racial Equality (CORE), rejected the pejorative term: "To make inexpensive guns impossible to get is to say that you're putting a money test on getting a gun. It's racism in its worst form." Some advocates of the pistol say that it is reliable, despite its low cost. Association of Firearm and Tool Mark Examiners (AFTE) reported that a Phoenix Arms Model Raven with an altered or damaged sear tip discharged unintentionally when the safety was moved "off" after the trigger had been pulled with the safety "on".

Criminal uses
An MP-25 was used in the April 24, 1998 Parker Middle School dance shooting. The shooter shot two teachers (one fatally) and two students with his father's pistol.
Serial killer Robert Lee Yates shot his victims with two MP-25 guns.
Mark Orrin Barton used an MP-25 and several other handguns in his killing spree in Atlanta and Stockbridge, Georgia on July 29, 1999 before killing himself. The MP-25 had been purchased from a pawnshop by someone else in 1991.

See also
Arcadia Machine & Tool
Davis Industries
Jimenez Arms
Phoenix Arms
Lorcin Engineering Company
Sundance Industries

References

External links 
 

1970 establishments in California
1991 disestablishments in California
Companies based in the City of Industry, California
Defunct firearms manufacturers
Firearm manufacturers of the United States
Manufacturing companies disestablished in 1991
Manufacturing companies established in 1970
Defunct manufacturing companies based in California
Defunct manufacturing companies based in Nevada